The Sri Lanka National Guard (SLNG) is the largest regiment in the Sri Lanka Army. It is a volunteer regiment currently made up of 20 battalions coming under the Sri Lanka Army Volunteer Force.

History 
The number of battalions was gradually increased to 16 and named the "Sri Lanka National Guard". They were under the command of then-lieutenant colonel D. W. Hapuarachchi (who was also a major general) SLSR as Commandant SLNG, thus becoming the largest Regiment in the Sri Lanka Army at the time.

Units

Order of precedence

See also 
Sri Lanka Army
Ceylon National Guard
Colombo Town Guard
Sri Lanka Home Guard

References

External links and sources 
 Sri Lanka Army
 Sri Lanka National Guard

Sri Lanka Army Volunteer Force
1991 establishments in Sri Lanka
N
Military units and formations established in 1991
Reserve forces of Sri Lanka